"Sexy movimiento" (English: "Sexy Movement") is the first single from Wisin & Yandel's album Wisin vs. Yandel: Los Extraterrestres. In January 2008, the song reached number-one on the Billboard Hot Latin Tracks chart in the United States.

Other
A remix was done with Nelly Furtado that can be found on Los Extraterrestres: Otra Dimension.
Other remixes were done with Voltio, Daddy Yankee and Mega & Kenai.
The song was included in the video  game Grand Theft Auto IV, on the radio station named San Juan Sounds.
The song was included on Ivy Queen's first live album Ivy Queen 2008 World Tour LIVE!.
The song is used by Toronto Blue Jays player José Bautista when he comes up to bat.
The song is featured on the Disney Channel animated series Elena of Avalor.
Mexican female professional wrestler Sexy Star uses "Sexy Movimiento" as her theme song.

Track listing & Digital download
Original
"Sexy Movimiento" – 3:52

Remix
"Sexy Movimiento"  – 3:52

Charts

Weekly charts

Year-end charts

Accolades

American Society of Composers, Authors, and Publishers Awards

|-
|rowspan="1" scope="row"|2009
|"Sexy movimiento"
|Urban Song of the Year
|
|-

References

2007 singles
Wisin & Yandel songs
Music videos directed by Jessy Terrero
Nelly Furtado songs
Songs written by Nelly Furtado
Ivy Queen songs
Spanish-language songs
Machete Music singles
2007 songs
Songs written by Wisin
Songs written by Yandel